This article presents a list of the historical events and publications of Australian literature during 1917.

Books 
 Barbara Baynton – Cobbers
 Randolph Bedford – The Silver Star
 Capel Boake – Painted Clay
 Mary Grant Bruce – Possum
 G. B. Lancaster – Fool Divine
 Henry Handel Richardson – Australia Felix
 Ethel Turner – Captain Cub

Short stories
 Vance Palmer – "Tobacco"
 A. B. Paterson – Three Elephant Power and Other Stories

Poetry 

 Zora Cross – Songs of Love and Life
 C. J. Dennis
 Doreen
 The Glugs of Gosh
 Leon Gellert – Songs of a Campaign
 Mary Gilmore
 "The Kiss"
 "The Mother"
 Henry Lawson – "Scots of the Riverina"
 Furnley Maurice – "1916"
 A. B. Paterson – Saltbush Bill, J.P., and Other Verses

Births 

A list, ordered by date of birth (and, if the date is either unspecified or repeated, ordered alphabetically by surname) of births in 1917 of Australian literary figures, authors of written works or literature-related individuals follows, including year of death.

 11 March –  Nancy Cato, novelist and poet (died 2000)
 21 March – Frank Hardy, novelist (died 1994)
 25 March – Barbara Jefferis, novelist and dramatist (died 2004)
 24 August – Ruth Park, novelist (died 2010)
 28 August – Wilbur G. Howcroft, poet and writer for children (died 2004)
 12 October – James McAuley, poet (died 1976)
 17 October – Sumner Locke Elliott, novelist and dramatist (died 1991)
 20 October – D'Arcy Niland, novelist (died 1967)
 3 November – J. E. Macdonnell, novelist (died 2002)
 22 November – Jon Cleary, novelist (died 2010)

Deaths 

A list, ordered by date of death (and, if the date is either unspecified or repeated, ordered alphabetically by surname) of deaths in 1917 of Australian literary figures, authors of written works or literature-related individuals follows, including year of birth.

 18 October – Sumner Locke, novelist (born 1881)

See also 

 1917 in poetry
 List of years in literature
 List of years in Australian literature
1917 in literature
 1916 in Australian literature
 1917 in Australia
 1918 in Australian literature

References

Literature
Australian literature by year
20th-century Australian literature